Sulfamazone (INN) is a sulfonamide antibiotic with antipyretic properties.

References 

Sulfonamide antibiotics
Pyrazolones
Pyridazines
Sulfonic acids